The 2011–12 Stephen F. Austin Lumberjacks basketball team represented Stephen F. Austin University in the 2011–12 men's college basketball season. This was head coach Danny Kaspar's twelfth season at SFA. The Lumberjacks play their home games at the William R. Johnson Coliseum. They are members of the West Division of the Southland Conference. They finished the season 20–12, 12–4 in Southland play to finish in second place in the West Division. They lost in the semifinals of the Southland Basketball tournament to Lamar. Despite having 20 wins, they did not participate in a post season tournament.

Roster

Schedule and Results
Source
 All times are Central

|-
!colspan=9| Regular season

|-
!colspan=9| 2012 Southland Conference men's basketball tournament

References

Stephen F. Austin Lumberjacks basketball seasons
Stephen F. Austin
Stephen F. Austin Lumberjacks basketball
Stephen F. Austin Lumberjacks basketball